Paranoid refers to paranoia, a thought process that typically includes persecutory beliefs.

Paranoid may also refer to:

Music
 Paranoid (band), a German EBM group
 Paranoid (album) or the title song (see below), by Black Sabbath, 1970

Songs 
 "Paranoid" (Black Sabbath song), 1970
 "Paranoid" (Jonas Brothers song), 2009
 "Paranoid" (Kanye West song), 2009
 "Paranoid" (Post Malone song), 2018
 "Paranoid" (Ty Dolla Sign song), 2013
 "Paranoid", by Dizzee Rascal from Maths + English
 "Paranoid", by Grand Funk Railroad from Grand Funk
 "Paranoid", by Spring King from A Better Life

Other uses
 Paranoid (film), a 2000 thriller directed by John Duigan
 Paranoid (TV series), a 2016 British crime drama
 "Paranoid: A Chant", a 1985 poem by Stephen King

See also 
 Paranoia (disambiguation)